

Events 
February 6 – The Virginia Minstrels perform the first minstrel show (Bowery Amphitheatre, New York City).
May 22 – Gottfried Kinkel marries fellow musician Johanna Mockel.
November 13 – Gaetano Donizetti's final opera Dom Sébastien is premiered at the Paris Opera.
December 26 – Following the première of his last opera, Hernani, Alberto Mazzucato retires from composing in order to become a full-time music teacher.
Approximate date – Euphonium invented.
August Conradi becomes organist of the Invalidenhaus, Berlin.
Hector Berlioz writes Grand traité d'instrumentation et d'orchestration modernes, Op. 10

Popular music 
 "Columbia, the Gem of the Ocean" by Thomas Becket
 "I Dreamt I Dwelt in Marble Halls" w. Alfred Bunn m. Michael William Balfe from the light opera The Bohemian Girl
 "Old Dan Tucker", usually attributed to Dan Emmett
 "Then You'll Remember Me" w. Alfred Bunn m. Michael William Balfe from the light opera The Bohemian Girl

Classical music 
Dionisio Aguado – Nuevo método para guitarra, Op. 6
Ernesto Cavallini – Concert Fantasia on motives from 'La sonnambula'
Frédéric Chopin
Impromptu No. 3 in G-flat major, opus 51
Ballade No. 4 in F minor, opus 52
Mazurkas, Op.56
Waltz in A minor, B.150
Moderato in E major, B.151
August Conradi – Symphony No. 1
Carl Czerny – 8 Nocturnes romantiques de différents caractères, Op.604
Carl Filtsch 
Premières pensées musicales, Op.3
Overture for orchestra in D major
Niels Gade – Symphony No. 2
Miska Hauser – Mes adieux a Varsovie, Op.5
Johanna Kinkel – 6 Lieder, Op.18
Sebastian Lee – 40 Études mélodiques et progressives, Op.31
Franz Liszt 
Album Leaf in E major S.166a
Élégie sur des motifs du Prince Louis Ferdinand de Prusse, S.168
Ländler in A-flat major, S.211
Gaudeamus igitur, S.240
Canzone Napolitana, S.248
Il m'aimait tant, S.271
Die Zelle in Nonnenwerth, S.274
Es war ein König in Thule, S.278
Der du von dem Himmel bist, S.279
Die tote Nachtigall, S.291
Réminiscences de 'Robert le diable', S.413
Hans Christian Lumbye 
Tivolis Rutschbane Galop (dated August 11)
Tivolis Damp-Caroussellbane Galop (dated August 26)
Tivolis Gondol Galop (dated September 3)
Felix Mendelssohn
Cello Sonata No. 2 in D major, Op. 58
Die erste Walpurgisnacht, secular cantata, opus 60 (première in Leipzig, February 2)
Joachim Raff – 4 Galop-caprices, Op.5
Robert Schumann − Paradise and the Peri, secular oratorio, opus 50 (premiere in Leipzig, December)
Johann Strauss – Lorelei Rhein Klänge op. 154 ("Echoes of the Rhine Loreley")
Pauline Viardot – Album de Mme. Viardot-Garcia

Opera
27 November –  Michael William Balfe's The Bohemian Girl debuts in London at the Theatre Royal, Drury Lane
Julius Benedict – The Bride of Venice
Gaetano Donizetti – Don Pasquale
Giovanni Pacini – Medea
Giuseppe Verdi – I Lombardi
Richard Wagner – The Flying Dutchman
Fromental Halévy – Charles VI, premiered March 15 in Paris

Births 
January 22 – Caroline Montigny-Rémaury, pianist (died 1913)
February 6 – Frederic William Henry Myers, lyricist (died 1901)
February 10 – Adelina Patti, soprano (died 1919)
February 14 – Louis Diémer, pianist (died 1919)
February 24 – Violet Fane, lyricist (died 1905)
February 25 – Narciso Serradell, Mexican composer (died 1910)
March 6 – Arthur Napoleão dos Santos, Brazilian pianist and composer, instrument dealer and music publisher (died 1925)
March 16 
Louis Gregh, composer and publisher (died 1915)
Gustave Sandré, composer (died 1916)
April 4 – Dr. Hans Richter, conductor (died 1916)
April 8 – Asger Hamerik, composer (died 1923)
May 2 – Karl Michael Ziehrer, Austrian composer and bandmaster (died 1922)
May 20 – Miguel Marqués, Spanish composer and violinist (died 1918)
May 29 – Émile Pessard, French composer (died 1917)
June 13 – Adolf Neuendorff, German-American composer, conductor, pianist and violinist (died 1897)
June 15 – Edvard Grieg, Norwegian composer (died 1907)
June 16 – David Popper, cellist and composer (died 1913)
June 19 – Charles Edouard Lefebvre, French composer (died 1917)
June 20 – Fyodor Stravinsky, opera singer and father of Igor Stravinsky (died 1902)
August 4 – Flor van Duyse, Belgian composer and musicologist (died 1910)
August 5 – James Scott Skinner, Scottish dancing master, violinist, fiddler, and composer (died 1927)
August 20 – Christina Nilsson, operatic soprano (died 1921)
August 26 – Georg August Lumbye, Danish composer, son of Hans Christian Lumbye (died 1922)
September 4 – Ján Levoslav Bella, Slovak composer (died 1936)
November 2 – 
Elek Erkel, Hungarian composer, son of Ferenc Erkel (died 1893)
Caryl Florio, composer (died 1920)
November 16 – George Hendrik Witte, composer (died 1929)
November 28 – Émile Bernard, French composer and organist (died 1902)
December 3 – Franz Xaver Neruda, Danish cellist and composer (died 1915)
December 13 – George Stephanescu, Romanian composer (died 1925)
December 22 – Julius Bechgaard, Danish composer (died 1917)
date unknown – Eduard Holst, Danish composer

Deaths 
January 7 – Franz Schoberlechner, pianist (born 1797)
January 11
Auguste Andrade, singer (born 1793)
Antoine Bournonville, dancer, singer and actor, 82
Francis Scott Key, poet and songwriter, 63
March 9 – Christian August Pohlenz, conductor and composer, 52
April 14 – Josef Lanner, Viennese composer, 42 (typhoid)
May 3 – Franz Xaver Gebel, conductor, composer and music teacher, 55 or 56
May 4 – Eduard Rottmanner, organist and composer, 33
May 12 – Johann Georg Lickl, composer and piano teacher, 74
July – Nehemiah Shumway, composer of sacred music, 81
July 9 – Karoline Pichler, lyricist (born 1769)
July 24 – Carl Julius Adolph Hugo Hoffmann, composer (born 1801)
July 29 – Domenico Reina, operatic and bel canto tenor, 47
August 29 – Charles Jane Ashley, cellist and secretary of the Royal Society of Musicians, 70
date unknown
Therese Jansen Bartolozzi, pianist (born c.1770)
Agnes Franz, lyricist (born 1794)
Knut Luraas, Hardingfele fiddler (born 1782)

 
19th century in music
Music by year